Darrick Forrest Jr. (born May 22, 1999) is an American football free safety for the Washington Commanders of the National Football League (NFL). He played college football at Cincinnati and was drafted by Washington in the fifth round of the 2021 NFL Draft.

Early life and college
Forrest was born on May 22, 1999, and attended Walnut Ridge High School in Columbus, Ohio. A 3-star recruit, Forrest committed to play college football at Cincinnati over offers from Ball State, Bowling Green, Eastern Michigan, Miami (OH), Ohio, Toledo, and Youngstown State.

Professional career

Forrest was drafted by the Washington Football Team in the fifth round (163rd overall) of the 2021 NFL Draft. He signed his four-year rookie contract on May 13, 2021. He was placed on injured reserve on September 1, 2021. He was activated on November 2, 2021.

In Week 1 of the 2022 season against the Jacksonville Jaguars, Forrest had his first career start and recorded five tackles, two deflected passes, a forced fumble, and a game-sealing interception, which was the first of his career, late in the fourth quarter. In Week 10, Forrest recorded an interception and a fumble recovery in Washington's 32-21 upset victory over the undefeated Philadelphia Eagles. Before the Week 11 game, Forrest was made the starting free safety taking over for Bobby McCain. Forrest recorded his third career interception in Washington's 23-10 victory over the Houston Texans.

References

External links

Washington Commanders bio
Cincinnati Bearcats bio

1999 births
Living people
Players of American football from Columbus, Ohio
American football safeties
Cincinnati Bearcats football players
Washington Commanders players
Washington Football Team players